Kovalevo is a rural locality (a selo) in Alexeyevsky District, Belgorod Oblast, Russia. The population was 338 as of 2010. There are 3 streets.

Geography 
Kovalevo is located 28 km south of Alexeyevka (the district's administrative centre) by road. Belozorovo is the nearest rural locality.

References 

Rural localities in Alexeyevsky District, Belgorod Oblast
Biryuchensky Uyezd